Bruno Boscardin (born 2 February 1970 in Le Grand-Saconnex) is a former Swiss racing cyclist. He held an Italian citizenship, and was naturalized as Swiss in 1997.

Major results
1994
1st stage 1 Hofbrau Cup
1996
1st Tour du Haut Var
1st stage 7 Paris–Nice
1997
1st stage 4 Tour du Limousin
1999
1st Tour du Lac Léman
1st stage 3 Setmana Catalana de Ciclisme

References

1970 births
Living people
Swiss male cyclists
Italian male cyclists
Sportspeople from the canton of Geneva